The women's team Squash event was part of the squash programme and took place between September 24 and 27, at the Yeorumul Squash Courts.

Schedule
All times are Korea Standard Time (UTC+09:00)

Results

Group play stage

Pool A

Pool B

Knockout stage

Semifinals

Gold medal match

Non-participating athletes

References 

Squash Site Page

Squash at the 2014 Asian Games